The 137th Signal Company is an Ohio Army National Guard Signal Company. It is based out of Springfield, Ohio. The 137th Signal Company is a member of the 371st Special Troops Battalion (Newark, Ohio), which is a member of the 371st Sustainment Brigade.

The 137th provides radio and satellite communications assets and expertise to the 371st Sustainment Brigade and its subordinate units. Members of the company are trained to provide reliable, secure, tactical communications in a variety of situations such as the battlefield, disaster relief, and standard infrastructure. 

In general, a signal company is able to provide both line of sight (LOS) and beyond line of sight (BLOS) capabilities to supported units to enable both local and remote communication pathways. The 137th Signal Company also possesses disaster response capabilities through the Disaster Incident Response Emergency Communications Terminal (DIRECT) system, which enables National Guard signal units to provide commercial phone, internet access, and commercial Wi-Fi and 4G LTE to first responders.

History 

The 137th Signal Company was constituted on 1 September 2006 as the Signal Detachment, 371st Sustainment Brigade. The Signal Company was reorganized and re-designated on 1 November 2011 as the 137th Signal Company.

The Signal Detachment supported President Obama's Inauguration January 2008.

The 137th Signal Company has responded to hurricane Gustav (2008) and hurricane Maria (2017) in Puerto Rico.

The 137th Signal Company participated in a Joint Readiness Training Center, rotation in 2016.

The company relocated from Newark, Ohio to Springfield, Ohio in August 2021.

References
 Lineage And Honors Information - 137 Signal Company
 Facebook: 371 Sustainment Brigade
 Ohio National Guard Homepage
 137th Signal Company returns from Puerto Rico
 Ohio National Guard sends signal company to help rebuild communications in Puerto Rico
 PROGRAM EXECUTIVE OFFICE COMMAND CONTROL COMMUNICATIONS-TACTICAL

Companies of the United States Army National Guard
371
Newark, Ohio
Ohio National Guard units
Military units and formations in Ohio
Military units and formations established in 2007